Frederick Lonsdale (5 February 1881 – 4 April 1954) was a British playwright known for his librettos to several successful musicals early in the 20th century, including King of Cadonia (1908), The Balkan Princess (1910), Betty (1915), The Maid of the Mountains (1917), Monsieur Beaucaire (1919) and Madame Pompadour (1923).  He also wrote comedy plays, including The Last of Mrs. Cheyney (1925) and On Approval (1927) and the murder melodrama But for the Grace of God (1946). Some of his plays and musicals were made into films, and he also wrote a few screenplays.

Personal life
Lonsdale was born Lionel Frederick Leonard in St Helier, Jersey, the son of Susan (née Belford) and John Henry Leonard, a tobacconist. He began as a private soldier and worked for the London and South Western Railway. His daughters included his biographer Frances Donaldson and Angela Worthington (who was born illegitimately, through his relationship with Muriel Rose Morice), while his grandsons included the actors Edward and James Fox, and the film producer Robert Fox.

Career

Frank Curzon produced the young Lonsdale's first work, the musical King of Cadonia (1908). Lonsdale's more substantial than usual dialogue for the show's Ruritanian comic opera plot won King of Cadonia fine notices and helped the musical to a long career. His next success was also for Curzon, The Balkan Princess (1910); this was little more than King of Cadonia with the sexes reversed, but it enjoyed a good London run, a long and wide provincial tour, and foreign productions.

Lonsdale's next success was five years later, for George Edwardes, with Betty (1915). Following Edwardes's death, he submitted to Edwardes' executor, Robert Evett, a text that Curzon had rejected, The Maid of the Mountains (1917; revived in 1920), which became one of the phenomenally successful wartime shows in London, establishing itself as a classic of the British musical stage.

Lonsdale continued to write some musicals after the war. He adapted Booth Tarkington's Monsieur Beaucaire (1919, with music by André Messager) as a highly successful light opera and Jean Gilbert's Die Frau im Hermelin (1922, The Lady of the Rose) and Katja, die Tänzerin (1925), as well as Leo Fall's Madame Pompadour (1923). He also wrote the successful original book to the Parisian tale of The Street Singer (based on a 1912 film of the same name for Phyllis Dare (1924) and Lady Mary (1928).

He also began to write straight comedies, and his plays included Aren't We All? (1923), Spring Cleaning (1925), The Last of Mrs. Cheyney (1925, which ran for 514 performances), On Approval (1927), Canaries Sometimes Sing (1929) and Let Them Eat Cake (a.k.a. Half a Loaf) among others. In 1946 he had a further West End hit with the murder melodrama But for the Grace of God. His last play, The Way Things Go, was written in 1949, more than 40 years after his first stage work and five years before his death in London from a heart attack. It was staged in 1950 with a cast including Kenneth More and Glynis Johns and ran for 155 performances in the West End.

Selected filmography
The Fast Set, directed by William C. deMille (1924, based on the play Spring Cleaning)
A Kiss in the Dark, directed by Frank Tuttle (1925, based on the play Aren't We All?)
The Fake, directed by Georg Jacoby (UK, 1927, based on the play The Fake)
The Last of Mrs. Cheyney, directed by Sidney Franklin (1929, based on the play The Last of Mrs. Cheyney)
The Lady of Scandal, directed by Sidney Franklin (1930, based on the play The High Road)
On Approval, directed by Tom Walls (UK, 1930, based on the play On Approval)
Canaries Sometimes Sing, directed by Tom Walls (UK, 1931, based on the play Canaries Sometimes Sing)
Women Who Play, directed by Arthur Rosson (UK, 1932, based on the play Spring Cleaning)
Aren't We All?, directed by Harry Lachman (UK, 1932, based on the play Aren't We All?)
The Maid of the Mountains, directed by Lupino Lane (UK, 1933, based on the musical The Maid of the Mountains)
Leave It to Smith, directed by Tom Walls (UK, 1933, based on the play Never Come Back)
The Last of Mrs. Cheyney, directed by Richard Boleslawski (1937, based on the play The Last of Mrs. Cheyney)
On Approval, directed by Clive Brook (UK, 1944, based on the play On Approval)
The Law and the Lady, directed by Edwin H. Knopf (1951, based on the play The Last of Mrs. Cheyney)

Screenwriter
 The Devil to Pay! (dir. George Fitzmaurice, 1930)
 Lovers Courageous (dir. Robert Z. Leonard, 1932)
 Bad Subject (dir. Carlo Ludovico Bragaglia, 1933) - Italian remake of The Devil to Pay!
 The Private Life of Don Juan (dir. Alexander Korda, 1934)

Further reading
Biography: Donaldson, F: Freddy Lonsdale (Heinemann, London, 1957)

References
Aren't We all full text on internet archive
Let them eat cake full text on internet archive
The last of Mrs Cheney full text on gutenberg

External links
 
 
Biography of Lonsdale

Two plays by Frederick Lonsdale at Great War Theatre

 
1881 births
1954 deaths
Jersey musicians
People from Saint Helier
Robin Fox family
English male dramatists and playwrights